Shirley Dubinsky (born March 11, 1925) was an American citizen who attempted to defect to the Soviet Union in 1962.  She refused to leave the Soviet Union when her visa expired. She was committed to a mental hospital on January 5, 1963, with a mental diagnosis of "schizophrenic break." After being hospitalized she returned to the United States on February 1, 1963. She was mentioned by the United States Congress Defector Study in 1979.

References

1925 births
American defectors to the Soviet Union
American refugees
Possibly living people